Yugoslavia was present at the Eurovision Song Contest 1967, held in Vienna, Austria.

Before Eurovision

Jugovizija 1967 
The Yugoslav national final to select their entry, was held on 19 February at the RTV Ljubljana Studios in Ljubljana and hosted by Tomaz Tercek. There were 15 songs in the final, from the five subnational public broadcasters;  RTV Ljubljana,  RTV Zagreb,  RTV Belgrade,  RTV Sarajevo, and  RTV Skopje. The winner was chosen by the votes of a jury of experts, one juror from each of the subnational public broadcasters of  JRT. The winning song was "Vse rože sveta" performed by the Slovene singer Lado Leskovar, composed by Urban Koder and written by Milan Lindič. Lado Leskovar previously took part in the 1965 and 1966 Yugoslav finals.

At Eurovision
Vladimir "Lado" Leskovar performed 15th on the night of the Contest following Monaco and preceding Italy. At the close of the voting the song had received 7 points, coming 8th in the field of 17 competing countries.

Voting

Notes

References

External links
Eurodalmatia official ESC club
Eurovision Song Contest National Finals' Homepage
Eurovision France
ECSSerbia.com
OGAE North Macedonia

1967
Countries in the Eurovision Song Contest 1967
Eurovision